Postal Act may refer to:

 Postal Reorganization Act, a United States federal government administration legislation of 1970
 Postal Service Act, a piece of United States federal legislation of 1792

See also
 Postal Services Act (disambiguation)